Gayton is a village and civil parish in the English county of Norfolk.

History
Gayton's name is of Anglo-Saxon and Viking origin and derives from either the Old Norse for 'goat settlement' or the Old English for 'Gaega's settlement'.

In the Domesday Book, Gayton is recorded as a settlement of 51 households in the hundred of Freebridge. In 1086, the village was divided between the estates of William de Warenne, William d'Ecouis, Hugh de Montfort and Henry de Ferrers.

Gayton Hall still stands within the parish. It was built in the early Nineteenth Century and its gardens remain open to the public.

Geography
According to the 2011 Census, Gayton has a population of 1,432 residents living in 657 households.

Gayton falls within the constituency of North West Norfolk and is represented at Parliament by James Wild MP of the Conservative Party. For the purposes of local government, the parish falls within the district of King's Lynn and West Norfolk.

St. Nicholas' Church

Gayton's parish church dates largely from the Fourteenth Century and is dedicated to Saint Nicholas. In September 2013, James Meade, son of equestrian champion Richard Meade, and Lady Laura Marsham, daughter of Julian Charles Marsham, 8th Earl of Romney, got married in this church. Prince William, Duke of Cambridge, Prince Harry and Pippa Middleton were in attendance at the wedding.

Amenities
There is one pub in the village, The Crown. The village also has a butcher's shop, Gayton Goslings care/daycare centre, a hair salon, a fish and chip shop and petrol station combining convenience shop/post office. The village formally had a windmill and is currently seeing a large increase in the building of residential housing.

The majority of local children attend Gayton Church of England Primary School which was rated as a 'Good' school by Ofsted in 2012.

Notable Residents
 Julian Marsham (b.1948)- English peer
 Martin Brundle (b.1959)- retired British racing driver and commentator

References

External links

King's Lynn and West Norfolk
Villages in Norfolk
Civil parishes in Norfolk